Clive Leo McNeir is a British linguist and lexicographer, and an author of a series of crime novels, set mainly on the inland waterways of Britain. As a director of The European Language Initiative, he compiled and edited 12 dictionaries in 15 languages, including English, since the first one was published by Cassell in 1993.

Education

McNeir got a bachelor's degree in French and German from Queen Mary University of London, where he studied from 1963 to 1967.

Personal life
He and his wife, cookery writer Cassandra Mcneir, live in a 300 year old cottage in rural Northamptonshire.

Bibliography
Dictionaries and reference works
 Cassell Multilingual Dictionary of Local Government and Business: The European Language Initiative
 Geiriadur Terminoleg Trefniadaeth: Dictionary of Procedural Terms (1999)
 Thesaurus of the Gaelic Language (2011)

Crime novels
Marnie Walker Series
 Getaway with murder (2000)
 Death in Little Venice (2001)
 Kiss and Tell (2003)
 Devil in the Detail (2004)
 No Secrets (2006)
 Sally Ann's Summer (2007)
 Smoke and Mirrors (2009)
 Gifthorse (2011)
 Stick in the mud (2012)
 Smoke without fire (2015)
 Witching hour (2017)
 To have and to Hold (2019)
Beyond the grave (2021)

References

External links
Bloomsbury Book's author bio
Author's official site

British crime writers
Linguists from the United Kingdom
British lexicographers
Living people
Year of birth missing (living people)